Alumni Arena is a multi-purpose arena in Amherst, New York. The arena is home to the State University of New York at Buffalo men's and women's basketball teams, the women's volleyball team, and wrestling team. The facility has a capacity of 6,783 people for basketball games.

Description

"The Recreation and Athletics Complex (RAC) on the University's North Campus includes Alumni Arena, a $12.5 million Phase II Building and a $1.5 million outdoor playing fields complex."

"Alumni Arena's main gymnasium is home to the Bulls men's and women's basketball teams, wrestling team and the women's volleyball team." "The largest "free-floating" hardwood floor in the United States at the time it was built, it features basketball, volleyball and badminton courts circled by a 200-meter track and a capacity of 6,783 spectators following renovations during the summer of 2004."

The arena used to seat more than 8,000 people, but a renovation project funded by the Blue & White club reduced the seating to 6,783 by eliminating bleachers and adding chairbacks. The student section was relocated with the renovations. Before the renovations, the students used to generally sit behind the scorer's table, from baseline to baseline, except immediately behind the players' benches. Syracuse's Carrier Dome is the only on-campus college basketball facility in the state that is larger. The volleyball court was constructed for the World University Games in 1993.

"The building includes three levels of offices, locker rooms, equipment and training-therapy rooms, seminar rooms, and racquetball courts." "The Phase II Building on the north side of Alumni Arena has an Olympic-sized swimming pool and a separate diving well, a triple gymnasium, and dance studio." "Other areas are a wrestling practice room, two weight-training rooms (a fitness center and a varsity weight room), additional racquetball and squash courts, an erg room, and an aerobics room."

Behind Alumni Arena, a playing fields complex provides lighted outdoor space for several sports, including soccer, field hockey, softball, tennis, basketball, handball and archery.

In 2011, the lighting and sound systems in the arena were upgraded to state-of-the-art quality. A new video and scoring system was also installed.

On February 3, 2012, the Harlem Globetrotters played on the Bulls court. On August 22, 2013, President Barack Obama spoke to a sold-out crowd at Alumni Arena about the rising costs of college tuition.

See also
 University at Buffalo Stadium
 Amherst Audubon Field

Gallery

See also
 List of NCAA Division I basketball arenas

References

External links
Alumni Arena - Buffalo Athletics

1982 establishments in New York (state)
Basketball venues in New York (state)
Boxing venues in New York (state)
Buffalo Bulls
College basketball venues in the United States
College volleyball venues in the United States
College wrestling venues in the United States
Sports venues completed in 1982
Sports venues in Buffalo, New York
Sports venues in Erie County, New York
University at Buffalo
Volleyball venues in New York (state)
Wrestling venues in New York (state)